Lucía "Aling Lucing" Lagman Cunanan (27 February 1928 – 16 April 2008) was a Filipino restaurateur best known for having invented or at least re-invented sisig, a popular Kapampangan dish in the Philippines and Filipino diasporas worldwide.

Career

Lucia Cunanan was born in Tarlac on 27 February 1928. She settled in Pampanga after her marriage to Victorino F. Cunanan.

In 1974, she established Aling Lucing's, a restaurant in Angeles City. Her restaurant offered a reinvented variant of sisig which soon became nationally famous. The popularity of Cunanan's sisig had helped establish Angeles City as the "Sisig Capital of the Philippines", thus her earning the sobriquet "Sisig Queen".

Death
Cunanan was found bludgeoned to death in her Angeles City home with 10 stab wounds on 16 April 2008, aged 80. Two days after her murder, local police filed parricide charges against her 85-year-old husband, Victorino F. Cunanan. He was believed to have killed Lucia after she refused to give him money for his mistress’ needs.

References

1920s births
Year of birth uncertain
Kapampangan people
People from Tarlac
Filipino chefs
Filipino restaurateurs
Filipino women company founders
Filipino murder victims
People murdered in the Philippines
2008 deaths